(English: "One Hundred Poems Super Translation: Love Song") is a Japanese historical Josei manga written and illustrated by Kei Sugita, and published by Media Factory. An anime adaptation by TYO Animations began airing in July 2012.

Uta Koi is a "super liberal" interpretation of the Hyakunin isshu anthology of 100 romantic poems by 100 poets compiled during the Heian period.

Plot
Uta Koi details a selection of romantic poems from the Hyakunin isshu, including the tale of Ariwara no Narihira's affair with imperial consort Fujiwara no Takaiko, the romantic relationship between Narihira's brother Ariwara no Yukihira and his wife Hiroko, amongst others.

Characters

Main character who introduces poems from the Hyakunin isshu.

A poetry-loving aristocrat depicted as a womanizing playboy who elopes with Takaiko in a forbidden romance.

Daughter of Fujiwara no Nagara and later imperial consort of Emperor Seiwa, who elopes with Narihira.

Older brother of Narihira.

Wife of Ariwara no Yukihira.

Emperor of Japan and son of Takaiko, who is depicted as stubborn, insensitive and mischievous.

Wife of Sadaakira who enjoys nature, and has a gentle personality.

A woman of renowned beauty, favoured by the emperor. Formerly known by the name of Yoshiko.

A man who attempted to elope with Yoshiko, later known as Ono no Komachi, who then later became a monk.

A poet who specialises in wordplay.

Father of Fujiwara no Yukinari.

Media

Manga
As of April 2014 four volumes have been published, with the most recent published in December 2013. Over 400,000 copies of the manga series have been printed. The fourth manga volume sold 28,400 copies within the first week of release, ranking within the top 50 on the Oricon comic sales charts.

Drama CD
On 24 August 2011 the first drama CD volume was released.

Anime
An anime adaptation of Uta Koi began airing on 3 July 2012.

Episode list

References

External links
 

2010 manga
2012 anime television series debuts
Historical anime and manga
Josei manga
Media Factory manga
Kadokawa Dwango franchises
Romance anime and manga
TV Tokyo original programming
Yumeta Company